Kevin Pearce is a New Zealand former rugby league footballer who represented New Zealand in the 1957 World Cup.

Playing career
Pearce played for the Papanui club in the Canterbury Rugby League competition and also represented Canterbury. He was selected for the New Zealand national rugby league team in 1957 as a 21-year-old and played in the 1957 World Cup.

He played for the South Island against the North Island in 1959, kicking five goals, however a shoulder injury meant he was unavailable for the national trial match. He continued to represent Canterbury until 1962.

Later years
In 1968 and 1969 Pearce coached Papanui in the Canterbury Rugby League competition.

References

Living people
New Zealand rugby league players
New Zealand national rugby league team players
Canterbury rugby league team players
South Island rugby league team players
Papanui Tigers players
Rugby league second-rows
New Zealand rugby league coaches
1930s births